

Salem the Witch Girl
Salem the Witch Girl is a fictional character appearing in American comic books published by DC Comics.

In her panel seen within the pages of "The New Golden Age" #1, Salem Rula Nader is the daughter of an Armenian-American man and a woman who fled Limbo Town. When her parents fled to another dimension, Salem was affected by the Limbo Town Curse that causes any deserters of Limbo Town to unknowingly cause bad fates to happen to anyone they interact with. By 1940, Salem had encountered Doctor Fate who was unaffected by the Limbo Town Curse and at the same time when Salem was targeted by Wotan. After Wotan's plot was foiled, Salem became Salem the Witch Girl and became Doctor Fate's sidekick where she was also aided by black cat familiar Midnight and an enchanted sentient broomstick named Sweep. Doctor Fate had worked hard to find a way to free Salem the Witch Girl from the Limbo Town Curse. On the day when Inza Cramer was nearly killed by the Limbo Town Curse, Salem the Witch Girl mysteriously vanished where Doctor Fate suspected that forces from Limbo Town took her back. It was also claimed that the Justice Society Dark helped Doctor Fate to look for her and they haven't been able to find her. By the final issue of "Flashpoint Beyond", Salem the Witch Girl was among the thirteen missing Golden Age superheroes in the Time Masters' capsules. When those capsules have failed, they were all pulled back to their own time with history rebuilding around them.

Salem the Witch Girl was among the Lost Children on Childminder's island. She showed her frustration over the fact that nobody can find a way off the island.

In 1941, Salem the Witch Girl was with Doctor Fate when they found Mister Miracle fighting Solomon Grundy at the time when his Justice Society Dark teammates Zatara and Diamond Jack are having a spat. After Solomon Grundy is chained up, Mister Miracle states to Doctor Fate and Salem the Witch Girl that they should apprehend Bride of Grundy. Salem the Witch Girl then starts to ask Doctor Fate about her Limbo Town curse.

Sand Demon
Sand Demon is the name of a fictional character appearing in American comic books published by DC Comics.

Eddie Slick is the manager of the wrestler King Crusher, and provided him with mutative steroids to win a match. However, Firestorm eventually defeated him while exposing the steroid operation in the process. Eddie was later exposed to the same drugs as his wrestler and buried in the Nevada Desert for exposing the drug ring behind the steroids leaving the gangsters broke. Developing the power to control sand, he sought revenge and crossed paths with Firestorm. Firestorm thought that Sand Demon was Martin Stein, who had become too crazy to reason with. He used his powers to overheat Sand Demon enough to turn him into glass, which shattered when it hit the floor.

Sand Demon in other media
 A variation of Eddie Slick / Sand Demon appears in The Flash episode "Flash of Two Worlds", portrayed by Kett Turton. This version is a metahuman criminal from Earth-2 able to transform his body into sand. Zoom sends Sand Demon to Earth-1 to kill the Flash, but the speedster uses his electrical powers to turn Sand Demon into glass and shatter him.
 Turton also portrays the Eddie Slick of Earth-1, a human arsonist and career criminal who served time in Blackgate Penitentiary.

Sardath

Mia Saunders
Mia Saunders first appeared in JSA: All Stars #2 (1999). Mia is the infant daughter of Kendra Saunders (Hawkgirl). As a teenager, Kendra got pregnant with Mia and had to give her up for adoption to an Oregon couple. It is later revealed that Kendra regularly visits her daughter.

Scorcher
Scorcher is the name of different characters appearing in American comic books published by DC Comics.

Bike Buzzard's version
The first Scorcher is the leader of the Bike Buzzards and took part in the Sand Scrambler racing event. Scorcher and the Bike Buzzards did unorthodox methods to win the event and were defeated by the Teen Titans.

Arsonist version
The second version is an unnamed arsonist with a flamethrower.

Cynthia Brand
Cynthia Brand is a pyrokinetic supervillain who is an enemy of Scare Tactics.

First Dark Nemesis version
The first Scorcher that is a member of Dark Nemesis is a pyrokinetic and a human/H’San Natall hybrid who grew up in the same special orphanage as Blizard. Scorcher later orchestrated a prison break, and Risk discovered her connection with the same aliens with whom he has a heritage. The rest of Dark Nemesis worked for Veil again and killed her while framing Risk. The Teen Titans later found evidence to clear Risk's name.

Second Dark Nemesis version
The second Scorcher, a member of Dark Nemesis, is a pyrokinetic female and the successor of the previous version. She and the rest of Dark Nemesis were sent to acquire the files on Apex and were easily taken down by a refocused Titans.

Scorcher in other media
A variation of Scorcher appears in the Supergirl episode "Welcome to Earth", portrayed by Nadine Crocker. This version is an Infernian who twice attempted to assassinate President Olivia Marsdin before she could create a law allowing for aliens to come out into the open due to fearing it would result in more registration.

Scream Queen
Creators: Len Kaminski and Anthony Williams. First appearance: Showcase '96 #11 (December 1996).

Nina Skorzeny, a.k.a. the Scream Queen, was the vampire lead singer of Scare Tactics.

A member of the Skorzeny clan of vampires in Markovia, Nina's family was wiped out by a group of vampire killers called the Graveyard Shift. The group was responsible for many vampire concentration camps as they attempted to exterminate all the vampires in Markovia. Nina was able to survive their efforts and escaped to America. This left her with a deep distrust of humans, whom she called "breathers" or "normals."

After making it to America, she was captured by R-Complex, a government agency that subjected her to numerous experiments. She was eventually rescued by the efforts of Arnold Burnsteel and Fate. The pair also freed Fang, Slither, and Gross-Out. Burnsteel suggested the group form a band to serve as cover while they try to outrun R-Complex agents.

The Scream Queen met Catwoman on one occasion. The pair battled Graveyard Shift members and an elderly vampire in Gotham City. Nina was forced to kill the vampire to save Catwoman's life. She felt some guilt over killing a member of her own kind to save a human, but the pair had bonded, and Catwoman became one of the few humans that the Scream Queen saw as a friend.

Eventually, the Scream Queen began to change her view of her Scare Tactics teammates, finally seeing them as friends. Following Slither's death, Nina arranged for the group to take his ashes and throw them in his father's face. She also bit and sucked all the alcohol from Burnsteel's system when he got drunk to deal with his grief. Following Gross-Out's transformation and departure from Earth, the group was left with only three members. They vowed to carry on, however, and set out to search for new members.

The Scream Queen first appeared in DC Rebirth Suicide Squad (vol. 5) Annual #1 (October 2018).

Scream Queen in other media
 A variation of the Scream Queen appears in the teaser for the Batman: The Brave and the Bold episode "Trials of the Demon!". This version is based on the Silver Banshee. The Scream Queen joins forces with the Scarecrow in a plot to spread fear gas through pumpkins on Halloween, only to be foiled by Batman and the Flash.
 A variation of Scream Queen appears in Justice League: Crisis on Two Earths, voiced by Kari Wührer. This version is a Black Canary from an alternate universe who operates under the Crime Syndicate's Johnny Quick.

Shango

Shango is an adaptation of the deity Sàngó from the Yorùbá culture for the DC Universe.

The character, adapted by John Ostrander and Tom Mandrake, first appeared in Firestorm the Nuclear Man #95 (March 1990).

Within the context of the stories, Shango is a deity and the war chief of the Orishas. He is responsible for asking Ogun to sever the Golden Chain linking Ifé, the land of the gods, with Earth. He is also responsible for restoring it in modern times. When he leads the reemergence of the pantheon in Africa, he encounters Firestorm. He and the pantheon are taken to task by Firestorm for their abandonment of Africa.

Shark

The Shark is the name of three fictional characters in DC Comics publications.

Shark I
The first Shark is a non-superpowered commando. Along with his companions named Sardine and Whale, he is part of the World War II-era fighting unit called the Frogmen. His sole appearance is in Showcase #3 (July–August 1956). The story was written by Robert Kanigher, and illustrated by Russ Heath.

Shark II
The second Shark is the secret identity of criminal Gunther Hardwicke. He is a member of the Terrible Trio, along with the Fox and the Vulture. He wears a shark mask and uses fish-themed technology to commit crimes. This Shark—and the Terrible Trio—debuted in Detective Comics #253 (March 1958).

Shark III
The third Shark, who has used the aliases T. S. Smith and Karshon in the past, debuted in Green Lantern (vol. 2) #24 (October 1963). He is a tiger shark that rapidly mutated after exposure to nuclear waste (later retconned to be part of the Kroloteans' experiments in Green Lantern (vol. 4) #4 (October 2005)). The rapid evolutionary growth gives him high intelligence, a humanoid appearance and telepathic powers, but leaves him with his bloodthirsty shark instincts. This Shark has fought Green Lantern II, as well as Superman, Aquaman, the Justice League of America and the Black Condor II. The Shark's portrayal on the cover of Action Comics #456 (February 1976) was inspired by the hit 1975 film Jaws.

Shark in other media
 The Shark appears in The All-New Super Friends Hour, voiced by Robert Ridgely.
 The Shark makes several non-speaking cameo appearances in Justice League Unlimited as a minor member of Gorilla Grodd's Secret Society.
 The Shark makes several non-speaking cameo appearances in Batman: The Brave and the Bold.
 Karshon will appear in Aquaman and the Lost Kingdom, portrayed by Indya Moore.

Shat-Ru 

Shat-Ru is a supporting character appearing in American comic books published by DC Comics. Among the Lords of Order, he was formerly atagonistic against Doctor Fate for perceived failures as an agent of order, believing Kent Nelson to having humiliated the Lords of Orders for failing to abolish the forces of chaos caused by the Lords of Chaos during his tenure as Doctor Fate.

Shat-Ru would later challenge Inza Cramer Nelson as Doctor Fate, becoming trapped in the previous, old body of Kent Nelson unable to release himself without risking his own destruction. Overtime, Shat-Ru bonds with Nelson and Inza while posing as Kent's grandfather whom he is supposedly named after to continue his work as college teacher teaching archaeology. He also serves as Nelson's patron temporarily and enters into an intimate relationship with human Dorothea.

Shiv

Shiv is a fictional character appearing in American comic books published by DC Comics. She appeared in 11 issues of Stars and S.T.R.I.P.E., two issues of JSA and four issues of JSA All-Stars.

Cindy Burman is the daughter of the supervillain the Dragon King. She had a grudge against Stargirl.

Shiv was also a member of Johnny Sorrow's incarnation of the Injustice Society.

In the pages of "The New Golden Age", Shiv and Dragon King were seen in a flashback fighting Stargirl and S.T.R.I.P.E.

Shiv in other media
Cindy Burman appears in Stargirl, portrayed by Meg DeLacy as a teenager and Sophia Annabelle Kim as a child. This version is the girlfriend of Henry King Jr., rival of Yolanda Montez since first grade, Blue Valley High's cheerleading captain, and the most popular student at school, though most students shun her due to her mean-spirited nature. She is determined to follow in her father, Dr. Shiro Ito's, footsteps and join the Injustice Society, having been genetically modified at a young age and gaining a healing factor and retractable blades attached to her wrists. However, her father refuses to let her help him and generally ignores her, resulting in Cindy becoming bitter and spiteful as she feels no one truly loves her. In the two-part episode "Shiv", she steals some of her father's inventions to force him to accept her by fighting and badly injuring Stargirl before being driven off by the school janitor Justin. During a rematch with Stargirl, Henry Jr. gets caught in the crossfire and uses his burgeoning psychic powers to knock them both down before Ito has his daughter evacuated. In the episode "Brainwave", he imprisons her to keep her out of further trouble, but in "Stars and S.T.R.I.P.E." Pt. 2, she escapes, kills her father, and finds a gem containing Eclipso amongst the Wizard's possessions. In the second season, she works with Eclipso to create their own Injustice Society called Injustice Unlimited. While fighting Stargirl's Justice Society of America (JSA) and Shade, Stargirl accidentally breaks the gem, freeing Eclipso. He uses a shard of it to send Cindy to the Shadowlands despite Stargirl's best efforts to save her, though Shade eventually uses his powers to rescue her. Following this, Cindy forms a truce with Stargirl and calls Artemis Crock and her family to help defeat Eclipso before intending to make amends with Yolanda and join the JSA. During season three, Cindy notices that she is starting to develop scales on her skin. Ten years later, Cindy is stated to have become a member of the JSA under the alias of "Dragon Queen".

Silver Ghost
The Silver Ghost is a supervillain in the DC Universe.

The character, created by Gerry Conway and Ric Estrada, first appeared in Freedom Fighters #1 (March 1976).

Within the context of the stories, Raphael van Zandt is a member of the Secret Society of Super Villains as the Silver Ghost. He opposes the Freedom Fighters in general and Firebrand in particular.

Silver Ghost in other media
A female version of the Silver Ghost named Raya van Zandt appears in The Flash episode "The Flash & the Furious", portrayed by Gabrielle Walsh. This version is an ex-Air Force pilot under the call sign "Silver Ghost" who wields a meta-tech key fob that allows her to control any motorized vehicle. She seeks to form a group called the Young Rogues and recruits the supervillain Weather Witch to be its first member. The two of them break into an A.R.G.U.S. facility and steal an experimental WayneTech car capable of turning invisible, but after the superhero XS appeals to her better nature, Weather Witch secretly stops van Zandt from committing murder and escapes with her. In a later episode, "Gone Rogue", Weather Witch reveals she abandoned van Zandt in Bolivia.

Sidd

Sidd is a minor villain in Batman: The Brave and the Bold and later teams up with Clayface and Facade in Justice League.

Sin

Stretch Skinner
Hiram "Stretch" Skinner is a fictional character appearing in American comic books published by DC Comics.

Hiram "Stretch" Skinner is a novice private eye detective who is unnaturally tall and thin. He would become the sidekick of Wildcat.

Skyman

Sylvester Pemberton

Klar-Don
Klar-Don is a Kryptonian who was Superman's predecessor in fighting crime on Earth prior to the destruction of Kryton. When crimefighting, he operated under the alias of "Skyman". Superman learned of Skyman when Professor Hugo Blaine mentally sent Superman back in time where he experienced the lives of his Kryptonian genetic doubles.

Jacob Colby
Jacob Colby is one of the first official subjects for Lex Luthor's "Everyman Project". Luthor's project grants super-powers to Colby, who is given the codename "Skyman" after Luthor buys the rights to Infinity, Inc. from the Pemberton Estate. This Skyman had the power to control the air and the power of flight. Colby later becomes romantically involved with his teammate Starlight.

It is later revealed that Colby had been killed by his teammate Everyman who consumed Colby's body and gained the ability to assume his form, posing as Colby since his murder (fooling even Starlight with his deception).

Garrison Slate

Garrison Slate is the founder of S.T.A.R. Labs in the DC Universe. Created by Len Wein, Joey Cavalieri and Paris Cullins, he first appeared in Blue Beetle (vol. 6) #12.

Garrison Slate in other media
The CW series The Flash features Dr. Harrison Wells (Tom Cavanagh), an original character, as S.T.A.R. Labs' founder in Central City similar to Garrison Slate.

Slobo

Felicity Smoak

Safiyah Sohail
Safiyah Sohail is a fictional character appearing in American comic books published by DC Comics.

In the pages of DC Comics during the "DC Rebirth", Safiyah Sohail is depicted as the former lover of Kate Kane who keeps the pirate nation of Coryana in check.

Safiyah Sohail in other media
Safiyah Sohail appears in Batwoman, portrayed by Shivani Ghai. This version is the compassionate and charismatic ruler of a small community on the island of Coryana who is served by the Rifle and the Many Arms of Death. Additionally, she has history with Alice, having found her after she escaped from August Cartwright and with whom she shares a mutual hatred towards Catherine Hamilton-Kane, and is connected to Black Mask.

Johnny Sorrow

Speed Demon

Speed Demon is an alias used by different fictional characters appearing in American comic books published by DC Comics. The character first appeared in Superman's Pal Jimmy Olsen #15 (September 1956).

Jimmy Olsen

Jerry McGee
The second version was Jerry McGee, Tina McGee's husband who went by the name "Speed McGee" and "Speed Demon". He was a scientist for Genetech where he took the drug Steroid B-19 which gave him superhuman strength, speed, and endurance; he wanted revenge on his wife for leaving him, which brought him into conflict with the Flash. The hero managed to help him off the drug and Jerry eventually returned to his estranged wife.

Speed Demon in other media
 An allusion to Jerry McGee, named David McGee, appears in the pilot episode of the 1990s CBS The Flash. His death serves as the motivation for Tina McGee helping Barry Allen.

Horten Spence
Horten Spence is a fictional character appearing in American comic books published by DC Comics.

Horten Spence is a photojournalist at the Gothamite News who is paired up with Vicki Vale. They are sent to investigate the Fever phenomenon. While scouting out the buildings, they run into some members of the Street Demonz. They attack Vicki, but Horten protects her. Vicki then gives Horten a kiss as Batman swings overhead.

Horten Spence in other media
Horten Spence appears in the Batwoman episode "Time Off for Good Behavior", portrayed by Jaime M. Callica. This version is a former reporter from the Gotham Gazette.

Spin
Mr. Auerbach (first appearance in The Flash (vol. 2) #238 (May 2008)), was the son of a media mogul whose holdings included the cable news network KN News. He pursued a career in journalism, hoping to work his way up in his father's company. While working on a story, he met Edwar Martinez, who was capable of sensing the fears in others and making them a reality.
Auerbach eventually was put in charge of KN News, where he had a hand in determining much of the content that the network covered.

He also led a double life as the villain Spin. He kept Edwar captive in the basement of the news building, hooking him up to machines and forcing him to watch news coverage. In this setting, Spin was able to channel and direct Edwar's amazing ability.

His first caper was robbing a Fabergé egg from a local auction. He created a distraction by summoning earthquakes, which had been in the public's mind due to a recent quake in Hub City.

He took advantage of a comment made on television by the Flash expressing his financial woes. After the citizens of Keystone City started to feel some doubt about their local hero, Spin lured him to the Keystone City Salamanders stadium and forced him to steal many valuables from the fans there. This causes a massive public outcry against the Flash, which Spin enhances with his powers, even turning the original Flash against his successor.

When Spin and Edwar realized that the Flash had identified the source of the disturbances as emanating from KN News, he used his abilities to summon Gorilla Grodd to Keystone, the Rogue which Edwar sensed would make the speedster most anxious. Grodd, however, was not pleased with his sudden teleportation and a massive battle ensued. In the chaos, Edwar was released from his machinery and his powers went completely out of control, causing citizens to act out nearly every situation being mentioned in the media.

Spin in other media
A female character inspired by Spin named Spencer Young appeared in The Flash episode "News Flash", portrayed by Kiana Madeira. She is a young millennial who used to work with Iris West as a reporter before quitting her job, creating a blog about metahuman news called the "Spyn Zone", and competing with West's blog about the Flash. Amidst the Thinker's Enlightenment, Young's cellphone was hit with debris from the villain's exploding satellite, turning it into a meta-tech phone capable of controlling people's minds. After XS appears in Central City, Young uses her to manufacture disasters and report on them seconds before they happen to increase her blog's popularity. However, her plan is eventually thwarted by the Flash and she is remanded to Iron Heights Penitentiary.

Stalnoivolk

Stalnoivolk ( or "Steel Wolf") is a supervillain in the DC Universe.

The character, created by John Ostrander and Joe Brozowski, first appeared in Firestorm the Nuclear Man #67 (January 1988).

Ivan Illyich Gort is a Russian who underwent government experiments during World War II. He loyally serves the Soviet Union under the codename "Stalnoivolk" as a symbol of Russia's resistance to Nazi Germany. After the death of Joseph Stalin, he is exiled to Siberia for his participation in the purging of the Ukraine.

He is reactivated just before the Soviet Union dissolves by Major Zastrow, leader of the Red Shadows. Initially he is tasked with eliminating Firestorm, which becomes a mission that he cannot complete. He also encounters the Suicide Squad more than once.

Starling
In September 2011, The New 52 rebooted DC's continuity. In this new timeline, the Starling (Evelyn Crawford) is introduced as part of the relaunch of Birds of Prey as a highly skilled hand-to-hand combatant and markswoman who has been friends with the Black Canary since they worked undercover together at the Penguin's Iceberg Lounge. She is later chosen by the Black Canary to help reform the Birds of Prey, but later betrays the group. She was killed trying to escape a burning building after a battle with the Court of Owls when Canary unleashed her Canary Cry.

The Starling in other media
A variation of Evelyn Crawford named Evelyn Crawford Sharp appears in Arrow, portrayed by Madison McLaughlin. This version was a star student and gymnast before her family became H.I.V.E. test subjects, leaving Evelyn as the only survivor. First appearing in the season four episode "Canary Cry", she assumes the identity of Black Canary to seek revenge on the killer, Damien Darhk until Oliver Queen convinces her to stop to avoid tarnishing the Black Canary's reputation. In season five, she joins Queen's team of vigilantes as "Artemis", but eventually betrays them to serve as Prometheus' double agent upon learning of Queen's violent past. As part of Prometheus' plans, Evelyn frees Laurel Lance's villainous Earth-2 counterpart before joining her and Talia al Ghul in kidnapping Queen's friends and family to hold them hostage on Lian Yu. While working to stop Prometheus, Queen throws Evelyn in a cage, intending to come back for her. However, Prometheus detonates several explosives he planted on Lian Yu and no mention of Evelyn's survival or death has been mentioned in subsequent seasons, leaving her final fate unknown.

Cornelius Stirk

Stitch 
Stitch is a non-binary, animated effigy who is also the apprentice of the recent incarnation of Doctor Fate, Khalid Nassour. First appearing in Teen Titan Academy #1 and created by Tim Sheridan and Rafa Sandoval, the character is sent to the school by their mentor to learn what it means to be a hero. Despite their doubts, Stitch becomes a popular student and is elected as the school's class president. The character shares a close bond with Khalid, looking towards the other as a parental figure. Like their mentor, Stitch possess the ability of magic and can break the fourth wall. Combined with their fourth wall breaking and jovial, lighthearted personality, the character's likeness has been compared to that of Marvel's Deadpool.

Clarissa Stein
Clarissa Stein is the estranged wife of Professor Martin Stein (a.k.a. one-half of Firestorm). She was created by Gerry Conway and Pat Broderick and first appeared in Firestorm (vol. 2) #10.

Clarissa Stein in other media
Clarissa Stein appears in TV series set in the Arrowverse. She first appears in The Flash, portrayed by Isabella Hofmann, and makes subsequent appearances in Legends of Tomorrow, portrayed by Chanelle Stevenson and Emily Tennant. This version lives in Central City and displays a loving relationship with Martin. In Legends of Tomorrow, she becomes the mother of Lily Stein due to Martin's work with the Legends affecting the timeline.

Elinore Stone 
Elinore Stone is the mother of Victor Stone, also known as Cyborg, and a scientist at S.T.A.R. Labs. She was killed in the lab accident that forced her husband Silas to turn Victor into a cyborg. She was created by Marv Wolfman and George Pérez and first appeared in New Teen Titans #7 (1981).

Elinore Stone in other media 
 Elinore Stone appears in Teen Titans Go! issue #45 (2007).
 Elinore Stone appears in Doom Patrol, portrayed by Charmin Lee.
 Elinore Stone appears in Zack Snyder's Justice League, portrayed by Karen Bryson.

Silas Stone

Eric Strauss 

Eric Strauss (later Eugene DiBellia) debuted in Doctor Fate #1 in July 1987. Created by J.M Dematteis and Keith Giffen, the character was created to replace the original Doctor Fate character, Kent Nelson. He is the second character to assume the Doctor Fate mantle.

Born to a wealthy billionaire Henry Strauss and Rebecca Stauss, the latter whom was abusive to his wife and Eric himself. Selected as a future agent of order, Eric grew up aware of the existence of the Lords of Order, giving him a level of enhanced mystical awareness although it resulted in him possessing an abnormal personality that made him unable to interact with children his own age. He also possessed a special connection to his step-mother Linda due to the both of them being selected as future agents of order.

At the age of ten, Eric was chosen as Nabu's next agent of order to inherit the Doctor Fate mantle, subquentionally aging up the boy in a similar manner to Nelson before although this time, Eric's mind did not mature. He would act as Doctor Fate alongside Linda, the two often merging to become Doctor Fate. Nabu goes on to possess Kent's corpse to personally advise them. The three of them are soon joined by a friendly demon called Petey and lawyer Jack C. Small.

Overtime, despite Eric's mind being similar to a child of ten years old, Linda developed romantic feelings for her step-son while Eric reciprocated such feelings.  Eric is eventually killed on Apokolips during a battle with Desaad, forcing Linda to become Doctor Fate on her own. Linda is killed soon afterward by the Lords of Chaos. Eric and Linda's souls were reincarnated in the bodies of Eugene and Wendy DiBellia while Nabu reincarnates in Eugene and Wendy's unborn child.

Linda Strauss

Linda Strauss (later Wendy DiBellia) debuted in Doctor Fate #1 in July 1987.Created by J.M Dematteis and Keith Giffen, the character would eventually serve as the successor to Eric Strauss as Doctor Fate. She is the third character to assume the Doctor Fate mantle and the first female character to serve as Doctor Fate.

Wife to wealthy billionaire Henry Strauss, she would come to regret her marriage with Henry, having married him for his wealth despite the two having an age gap and was subjected to physical and emotional abuse by him prior to his death. She would also come to care for Eric Strauss, possessing a special connection with him due to being unknowingly selected as an agent of order. She eventually becomes Doctor Fate, often working alongside Eric in tandem while being guided by Nabu, whom possessed Kent Nelson's body, and are assisted by a friendly demon name Petey and Lawyer, Jack C. Small. Overtime, despite Eric's mind being similar to a child of ten years old, Linda developed romantic feelings for her step-son.

Eric is eventually killed on Apokolips during a battle with Desaad, forcing Linda to become Doctor Fate on her own. During her short tenure as Doctor Fate, she would become a member of the Justice League International.  Linda is killed soon afterward by the Lords of Chaos. Eric and Linda's souls were reincarnated in the bodies of Eugene and Wendy DiBellia while Nabu reincarnates in Eugene and Wendy's unborn child.

Super-Hip

Super-Turtle

Superboy

Supergirl

Superman

Superman robots

Supernova

Superwoman

Abin Sur

Amon Sur

Syl
Syl, also known as Sylvan Ortega, is a young magician, and an apprentice of Gregorio de la Vega, first appearing in DC Pride #1 (June 2021).

Syonide
Syonide is the name of different characters appearing in American comic books published by DC Comics.

Tomb Home inmate
The first Syonide is an unnamed inmate at an asylum called the Tomb Home. After escaping from prison, he caught a glimpse at Diana Prince and General Darnell where he had a delusion that they were Pocahontas and John Smith. After a brief fight with Wonder Woman, Syonide made his way to an abandoned house in the woods that Etta Candy was holding a costume party at where he made use of some leftover costumes to pose as Chief Powhatan. He proceeded to take the party attendees hostage until he was defeated by Wonder Woman.

Syonide II
The second Syonide is an unnamed man who worked as a mercenary for various criminal organizations like the 100. Tobias Whale of the 100's Metropolis branch hired him to dispose of Black Lightning. In one of his attacks on Black Lightning, Syonide also abducted Peter Gambi so that he and Black Lightning could be executed. When Syonide rigged the gun to kill himself, it also hit Gambi who sacrificed himself to protect Black Lightning.

Syonide III
The third Syonide is an unnamed female assassin who wields an electrical whip. She was hired by Tobias Whale to kidnap Valerie Harper and her parents and bring them to an abandoned warehouse. Tobias revealed to Valerie that Syonide killed her in Markovia. When the Outsiders attacked, Syonide attacks Valerie as her parents are killed trying to fight her. At the advice of Batman, Helga Jace later analyzed Valerie's brain waves where they learned that Valerie has an Aurakle in her which bonded to her body the day that Valerie was killed by Syonide.

Hired by a crime cartel, Syonide later accompanied Merlyn in targeting Phantom Lady when she was protecting a defecting Russian scientist in Casablanca. Both of them were defeated by Flash.

During the "Infinite Crisis" storyline, Syonide appears as a member of Alexander Luthor Jr.'s Secret Society of Super Villains.

Syonide IV
The fourth Syonide is a member of Lady Eve's incarnation of Strike Force Kobra and had a relationship with Fauna Faust. During Strike Force Kobra's fight with the Outsiders, Syonide was killed by Eradicator.

Syonide in other media
An unidentified Syonide appears in Black Lightning, portrayed by Charlbi Dean. In this version, she is Tobias Whale's henchwoman, hitwoman, and mob enforcer. When she was eight years old, Tobias discovered her in an orphanage, where she was abused and malnourished. He took her in and trained her in assassination techniques, while also putting her through a painful procedure that involved placing carbon fiber armor beneath her skin. Syonide is later killed in battle against Kara Fowdy.

References

 DC Comics characters: S, List of